Erik the Conqueror (lit. "The invaders") is a 1961 Italian-French epic swashbuckling film directed by Mario Bava and starring George Ardisson and Cameron Mitchell as long-lost Viking brothers in the 9th century, one of whom is raised in England, the other in Scandinavia. They finally meet after almost 20 years, as rivals on opposite sides of an English–Viking war. It is a loose remake of the American film The Vikings.

Plot

In 786 A.D., three large Viking ships land in England. King Harald, the only Viking chieftain interested in maintaining peace, makes a plea to King Loter. The English king sends Sir Rutford to work out a deal with the Vikings. Rutford stages a surprise attack on the Vikings. King Harald is felled by an arrow fired by Rutford's chief assassin. During the battle, Harald's two young sons, Erik and Eron, are whisked away by one of his chiefs. Eron is rescued, but Erik is left behind in the chaos.

Later, King Loter arrives on the scene, where he threatens to strip Rutford of his title. Rutford retaliates by having his assassin kill Loter with an arrow. Loter's wife, Queen Alice, runs away and, after finding Erik hiding on the beach, decides to raise him as her own son.

Twenty years later, the Vikings once again wage war against England. The adult Eron has fallen in love with a vestal virgin named Daya, the identical twin sister of the vestal Rama. They hide their love out of fear of being executed. Eron tells Daya that a king is permitted to marry a vestal. Viking leader King Olaf makes a pact with the kingdoms of Iceland, Norway, and Sweden to invade England once again. Due to his age, Olaf appoints a younger to lead the attack. Olaf chooses Eron, but his choice is contested by Garian. Garian wishes to be elected leader, and a vote by 100 warriors is taken. Olaf declares that they will have to fight to the death. Eron is victorious but refuses to kill his opponent, asking Garian to serve as his right-hand man.

In England, the adult Erik is appointed Duke of Helford and leader of the English sea forces, replacing Sir Rutford. Rutford plants an agent on board to set fire to Erik's ship while at sea.

The Viking and English fleets meet in the North Sea, and a sea battle begins. Vikings board Erik's flagship just as the agent sets fire to it. In the battle, Erik and Eron meet and engage in a swordfight. Erik's ship catches fire. Erik jumps overboard and later washes ashore in Viking land. Rama finds him. He points Erik in the direction of a local fishing village, where the Vikings accept him as a shipwrecked fisherman.

In England, Sir Rutford proposes marriage to the queen, who rebuffs him. Eron and his men arrive. Eron then appoints Rutford as Regent and takes Queen Alice as a hostage back to Viking land. There, Rama is assigned to look after Queen Alice. Rama notices that the queen also wears a cross and mentions this to Erik. Demanding to know the prisoner's name, Erik is shocked to find that it is his 'mother'.

The next day, Eron and Daya are to be married. As Erik watches the wedding ceremony, he mistakenly believes that it is Rama who is being married. Enraged by this imagined 'affront', Erik confronts Daya, who doesn't know him. Erik is then locked away by King Olaf to be executed the following morning.

Rama drugs Erik's guards, explains to him that the woman he saw married was her twin sister, and cuts him free. While they flee, Eron and a horde of Vikings give pursuit. Eron nearly falls to his death, but Erik, urged by Rama, rescues him from certain death. Eron continues to pursue them, but Erik and Rama meet up with Queen Alice, and they safely sail to England.

Erik gathers a combined English-Scottish force to attack Rutford's castle but finds that Eron and the Vikings have arrived before him. Erik challenges Eron to a duel. Eron accepts, leaving Daya in Rutford's care. In the ensuing swordfight, Eron catches sight of the tattoo on Erik's chest and recognises him as his brother. He declares a ceasefire, upsetting Rutford, who responds by having his henchman fire an arrow at Erik. Eron throws himself in the path of the arrow and is fatally wounded. The enraged Vikings attempt to storm the castle, but Rutford raises the drawbridge and threatens to kill Daya by the next morning if the Vikings do not disband.

As Eron lies dying, he names Erik as his successor. He becomes more delirious and asks to see Daya one last time. Erik determines to do this by breaking her out of the castle. Erik scales the castle wall. Meanwhile, Rama realizes that the dying Eron will not last much longer and poses as her sister to him. Eron is oblivious to the deception and finally dies upon declaring his love for her.

Erik makes his way into the castle, where he rescues Daya. The combined Viking, English, and Scottish armies attack the castle at dawn, scaling the walls and slaughtering the defenders. Rutford's men are killed, with Rutford himself being the last to fall when he attempts to throw a spear at the escaping Eron but is pierced with at least a dozen Viking arrows.

With peace restored, Queen Alice reclaims her throne and allows Erik to leave England to claim his title as King of the Vikings. Erik returns to Viking land with Rama while Daya sails alone with the dead Eron.

Cast
 Cameron Mitchell as Eron
 George Ardisson as Erik
 Alice Kessler as Rama
 Ellen Kessler as Daya
 Andrea Checchi as Sir Rutford
 Franco Ressel as King Lotar
 Françoise Christophe as Queen Alice
 Folco Lulli as King Harald
 Jean-Jacques Delbo as King Olaf
  as Bennet
 Raf Baldassarre as Floki
 Gianni Solaro as Ranco
 Livia Contardi as Hadda
 Franco Giacobini as Rustichello
 Joe Robinson (uncredited) as Garian

Production
Erik the Conqueror was shot in Rome's Titanus Studios.

Release
Erik the Conqueror was released theatrically in Italy on 7 December 1961 with a 98 minute running time. It was released in the United States on 12 June 1963 with an 81 minute running time.

Reception
In a contemporary review, reviewing an English-dubbed 88 minutes version, the Monthly Film Bulletin stated that the film is "enhanced by Mario Bava's luridly filtered photography and fluid camera technique, and his effortlessly eclectic direction" The review concluded that apart from the soundtrack which was described as "shattering", the technical credits were "above average, as is some of the acting", specifically pointing out Giorgio Ardisson and Andrea Checchi.

Due to the "effective" acting of Cameron Mitchell and the "full-sized Viking ships" this film has been named the best Viking picture made in Italy.

References

Footnotes

Sources

External links

Films directed by Mario Bava
1961 films
1961 adventure films
American International Pictures films
Italian adventure films
French adventure films
Fictional Vikings
Films set in the Viking Age
Peplum films
Sea adventure films
Sword and sandal films
1960s Italian films
1960s French films